Shekinah Glory Ministry is an American gospel music group ministry from Chicago, Illinois, they started making music in 2000. The group is from Valley Kingdom Ministries International in Chicago. They have their own label imprint, Kingdom Records, that all albums are released under. They have released nine albums, with five of them appearing on various Billboard charts. Their greatest-hits collection The Best of Shekinah Glory Ministry also charted on the Billboard charts in 2009. There are six different aspects to the group from Encouragers, Exalters, Karar, Minstrels, Signs & Wonders, and Standard Bearers.

Background
The Chicago, Illinois-based gospel music group ministry, Shekinah Glory Ministry started in 2000 at Valley Kingdom Ministries International. They have six different aspects to their group from Encouragers (ministers to attendees of their services), Exalters (singers), Karar (dancers), Minstrels (musicians), Signs & Wonders (sign-language interpreters), Standard Bearers (flag wavers).

History
The ministry released ten albums from 2000 until 2012, with six of those charting on various Billboard charts. The group has their own label imprint, Kingdom Records, that all albums are released under. The albums that charted were Praise Is What I Do in 2000, Live in 2005, Jesus in 2007, Refreshed by Fire in 2010, and Surrender in 2012. The ministry released, The Best of Shekinah Glory Ministry in 2009, that charted on various charts. The album, Live was rated eight out of ten by Cross Rhythms and the subsequent album, Jesus received a nine out of ten review by the publication. Their album Refreshed by Fire was rated three out of five stars at AllMusic, while their Surrender release was rather three and a half out of five stars. Their songs have been put on the WOW Gospel albums in 2003 and 2009.

Members
 Encouragers – Ministers to attendees of their services
 Exalters – Singers
 Karar – Dancers
 Minstrels – Musicians 
 Signs & Wonders – Sign-language interpreters
 Standard Bearers – Flag wavers

Discography

References

External links
 
 Cross Rhythms article

Musical groups established in 2001